The 2020–21 season was FC Emmen's 96th season in existence and the club's third consecutive season in the top flight of Dutch football. In addition to the domestic league, FC Emmen participated in this season's edition of the KNVB Cup. The season covered the period from 1 July 2020 to 30 June 2021.

Players

First-team squad

Pre-season and friendlies

Competitions

Overview

Eredivisie

League table

Results summary

Results by round

Matches
The league fixtures were announced on 24 July 2020.

Promotion/relegation play-offs

KNVB Cup

References

External links

FC Emmen seasons
FC Emmen